Richard Welding (born  in Wigan, Greater Manchester) is a rugby union footballer for the Rotherham Titans. His usual position is on the wing, but fills in at fullback when necessary.

Previously he played for Leeds Carnegie, who signed the Cornish Pirates' prolific try scorer on a two-year deal before the start of the 2006-07 National Division One. He made his Carnegie debut against his former club the Pirates as a replacement on 23 September 2006 at Headingley in a 21–20 victory.

Welding was one of the hottest properties in the 2005-06 National Division One after being named in Rugby Times' Team of the Year on the wing despite strong competition from the players at promotion winning Harlequins.

Welding began his rugby career at his local club Orrell, making his debut a week after his 18th birthday in 1999.

He then joined the Pirates at the start of the 2005–06 season after a successful period with Sedgley Park where he scored 11 tries in their first season in National Division One.

In 2005–06 Welding scored 16 tries in 24 appearances for the Pirates.

References

External links
Rotherham profile

1981 births
Living people
English rugby union players
Rugby union players from Wigan
Orrell R.U.F.C. players
Rotherham Titans players
Sedgley Park R.U.F.C. players